The Australia women's national squash team represents Australia in international squash team competitions, and is governed by Squash Australia.

Since 1979, Australia has won 9 World Squash Team Open titles. Their most recent title came in 2010.

Current team
 Rachael Grinham
 Donna Urquhart
 Christine Nunn
 Tamika Saxby

Results

World Team Squash Championships

See also 
 Squash Australia
 Squash in Australia
 World Team Squash Championships
 Australia men's national squash team

References

External links 
 Team Australia

Squash teams
Women's national squash teams
Squash
Squash in Australia